Hir District is in Ardabil County, Ardabil province, Iran. At the 2006 census, its population was 23,547 in 4,963 households. The following census in 2011 counted 21,709 people in 5,692 households. At the latest census in 2016, the district had 19,282 inhabitants living in 5,659 households.

References 

Ardabil County

Districts of Ardabil Province

Populated places in Ardabil Province

Populated places in Ardabil County